Monte Stivo is a 2,059 m mountain near Lake Garda, close to the cities of Arco and Riva del Garda in Italy.

References

External links 
 Monte Stivo at summitpost.org

Mountains of Trentino
Mountains of the Alps
Garda Mountains
Two-thousanders of Italy